Brotto is an Italian surname. Notable people with the surname include:

Juan Brotto (1939–2009), Argentine cyclist
Lori Brotto (born 1975), Canadian psychologist

Italian-language surnames